Killer Workout (originally titled Aerobicide) is a 1987 American slasher film written and directed by David A. Prior. It stars Marcia Karr, David James Campbell, Fritz Matthews, Ted Prior, and Teresa Van der Woude. The story revolves around a Los Angeles fitness club owned by Rhonda Johnson, who was burned in a tanning salon five years ago. Detective Morgan begins to investigate the gym, after several of its members are brutally murdered by an unknown attacker.

Plot
A young model is burned in a tanning salon accident. Five years later, people at a fitness club owned by Rhonda (Marcia Karr) in Los Angeles are being murdered by a mysterious killer who uses a large safety pin. It is up to Detective Morgan (David James Campbell) to solve the mystery and stop the killer.

Cast
Cast adapted from the Variety review.
 Marcia Karr as Rhonda Johnson
 David James Campbell as Lt. Morgan
 Fritz Matthews as Jimmy
 Ted Prior as Chuck
 Teresa Van der Woude as Jaimy

Release
Killer Workout was released direct-to-video in the United Kingdom under the alternative title Aerobicide in the spring of 1987. Academy Home Entertainment released the film on video in the United States on September 29, 1987.

Critical reception
A reviewer credited as "Lor." of Variety reviewed the film on March 14, 1987 on VHS by Academy Home Entertainment. "Lor." described the film as a "pretty standard slasher" and "unexciting",  "Lor." noted the film was too sparing in nude scenes to satisfy a voyeur audience while the final reel "boasts a couple of nice twists and an amoral ending."

In his book Horror and Science Fiction Film IV, Donald C Willis referred to the film as a "lame horror thriller" that was "crude at everything - t&a displays in the gym, suspense sequences, plot twists." In their review of the blu-ray, Bloody Disgusting opined that "the plot is the very basic slasher setup in that you meet a handful of characters and an unknown killer begins picking them off one by one...none of the characters are very well developed and are introduced to fit two very specific needs – be eye candy and become victims...this won’t result in a groundbreaking slasher that breaks the mold, but it works perfectly to create some enjoyable trash".

References

Sources

External links
 
 

1980s English-language films
American slasher films
Films set in California
Films shot in California
1980s slasher films
Films directed by David A. Prior